Nisar Qadri is a Pakistani radio, stage, and TV actor. He was honored with the Pride of Performance Award in 2016.

Career
Qadri started his career in 1966 at Radio Pakistan, Rawalpindi. Since then, he has starred in numerous TV dramas, movies, and radio plays. In the TV play "Aik Haqeeqat Aik Afsana", his catchy phrase "Machis hogi aap ke paas?" (Would you have a matchbox?) had gone viral among the viewers.

He has been suffering from facial palsy for the last some years and is unable to work on screen.

Filmography

TV
 Aik Haqeeqat Aik Afsana
 Samundar (1983)
 Karawaan (1985)
 Bahadur Ali
 Angar Wadi (1994)
 Aadhi Dhoop
 Pooray Chand Ki Raat (2004)
 Aatish

Films
 Khamosh Pani (2003)
 Hum Ek Hain (2004)

Awards

References

External links
 Nisar Qadri on IMDb

20th-century births
Pakistani male television actors
Year of birth missing (living people)
Living people
Recipients of the Pride of Performance